Pulteney Grammar School is an independent, Anglican, co-educational, private day school. Founded in 1847 by members of the Anglican Church, it is the second oldest independent school in South Australia. Its campuses are located on South Terrace in Adelaide, South Australia.

History

Foundation 

In May 1847, a group of founding trustees met in Adelaide in order to discuss the establishment of a new school for the children of Adelaide. Twelve months later, on 29 May 1848, the new institution Pulteney Street School was opened. The school was established in the Anglican tradition, which continues to this day, though it admitted students of all denominations and children from non-Christian faiths. 
It began operating shortly after St Peter's College was founded (and, years before that, that fellow Anglican establishment moved to its present location in Hackney). The Pulteney Street School was clearly aimed at a different demographic, having a monthly charge of 2/6d per month for each pupil, deemed "a rate which the poorest can surely afford to pay for the education of their children". The school had 50 attendees by the end of its first week of operation, and 180 by October 1848. Classes were taken at a newly constructed  building at the corner of Pulteney and Flinders streets, boys and girls being taught separately; the girls' classes ceasing around 1854.

Latter history 
21 principals have governed the school, the first being E. K. Miller, who served from 1848 to 1851, before being replaced by several of even shorter duration, during which the school's title became Pulteney Street Central Schools. More durable Principals, (W. S. Moore, 24 years in office, W. P. Nicholls, 41 years, and W. R. Ray, 26 years), led Pulteney to become an esteemed educational institution, with its traditional competitors including Scotch College, Prince Alfred College, and St Peter's College. The first female Principal, Anne Dunstan, took office in 2014.

In 1919 the old building was acquired by the Commonwealth Government for repatriation purposes, and the school was required to move to its current premises on South Terrace, where a new building, now called the Nicholls Building, was opened by Lord Forster, then Governor-General, in July 1921. The school's move heralded the change in its name to its current form, and also brought financial uncertainty to the board of governors, who elected W. R. Ray in 1946 to attempt to bring the school back onto its feet.

By 1953, Pulteney Grammar School offered a full education for boys, beginning in what is now called 'reception', until 'Leaving Honours' (Year 12).

The school changed its structure from an all-boys day-school to admit students of both genders in 1999.

School structure and demographics 

 
As of 2012, the School has 1000 students enrolled and over 150 teaching and non-teaching staff.
Pulteney is composed of four sub-schools located on the same campus. The 'Kurrajong' and the ELC (Early Learning Centre) for students up to year 2, Prep School for years 3–6, Middle School for years 7-9 and "one ninety" (Senior School) for the final years 10–12. Each sub-school is overseen by a Head of School responding to the Principal.

According to the Australian Curriculum, Assessment and Reporting Authority, the school economic background distribution is: 72% upper quarter, 23% upper middle quarter, 5% lower middle quarter, and 1% lower quarter. There are no Aboriginal students in the school community, as of 2015. The school attendance rate in 2013 was 100%.

Notable alumni 

An active Old Scholars' network maintains a connection between the institution and its alumni. Like other schools of a similar standing, Pulteney's alumni identify themselves with an old boys' tie, which is presented to students upon graduation.

Rhodes Scholars
Charles Ashwin, 1952. Rhodes Scholar for South Australia.
Peter Gibbard, 1991. Rhodes Scholar for South Australia.
Jack Turner, 1992. Rhodes Scholar Australia at large.
Mark Mussared, 1976. Rhodes Scholar for South Australia.
John Pritchard, 1935. Rhodes Scholar for South Australia.
Simon Best, 1973. Rhodes Scholar for South Australia.

Politics, diplomacy and Law
John Gardner MP, Minister for Education (2018–2022), Member for Morialta (2010–present)
Stephen Mullighan MP, Minister for Transport & Infrastructure (2014 - 2018), Member for Lee (2014–present)
Ted Mullighan, died 2011, QC and former Supreme Court Judge
The Hon. John Sulan, Justice of the Supreme Court of South Australia
Sir Frederick William Holder KCMG, 19th Premier of South Australia, prominent member of inaugural Commonwealth Parliament, first Speaker of the House of Representatives
John Darling Jr. MP, company director and politician, Member for East Torrens 1896–1902, Member for Torrens 1902-1905
Ian Haig  (1935–2014), diplomat and business leader

Medicine
Ernest Robert Beech, emeritus consultant physician of the Royal Perth Hospital
Wyatt 'Rory' Hume, pharmacologist, former vice-chancellor of the University of New South Wales, and Provost of the United Arab Emirates University
Sir Leonard Ross Mallen, died 1980, Federal councillor of the Australian Medical Association
Richard Sanders Rogers, medical pioneer, and authority on Australian orchids

Military
Arthur Seaforth Blackburn VC, soldier and lawyer; Winner of the Victoria Cross

 Colonel Walter Dollman VD, a Pulteney "old boy" and president of the Old Scholars Assoc., was commander of the 27th Battalion that saw service in Egypt, Gallipoli and in the Somme.
 David Kenney, flight lieutenant, awarded a Distinguished Flying Cross,
Brigadier General Stanley Price Weir, DSO, VD, JP (1866-1944), public servant and Australian Army officer

Sports
Lloyd Pope, Under 19 Australian Cricketer.
Bruce Abernethy, former AFL player and sports news reader.
Josh Francou, Magarey Medal winner 1996,player for North Adelaide Roosters(SANFL) and Port Adelaide Football Club(AFL) Australian rules football clubs.
Jordan McMahon, current player in the AFL for the Richmond Tigers.
Andrew Leipus, sports physiotherapist
Maurice P. Hutton, died 1940, cricketer and footballer
Harry Blinman, famous South Australian cricketer and former President of the South Australian Cricket Association
Michael Aish, Magarey Medal winner 1981

Arts
Peter Dawson, internationally acclaimed bass-baritone and songwriter
Harold Thomas, first Aboriginal student of Pulteney, and designer of the Australian Aboriginal Flag
Sean Williams, science fiction author
Lewis Fitz-Gerald, actor.
Jeffrey Smart, expatriate Australian artist of the Precisionist movement. Smart's works today return prices in excess of AUD$1,000,000 at auctions worldwide. He is a disciple of Adelaide artist  Kirkman Meller, died 1962, South Australian writer
Michael Burden, Fellow in Music, Dean and Chattels Fellow at New College, Oxford, also Director of New Chamber Opera, and Professor of Opera Studies in the Faculty of Music, University of Oxford
Keith Phillips, photographer, Official Photographer of University of Adelaide
Rhett Giles, Actor (Stage/Film) and Producer

Business
Joseph Albert Riley, (1869-1940), prominent Adelaide businessman, Secretary of the Chamber of Commerce, philanthropist, notably awarded the King Albert Medal for services in the Great War
Colin Blore Bednall, journalist and media manager, Editor and Director of Queensland Newspapers Pty Ltd.
Oscar Lionel Isaachsen, banker
Alan Scott Martin, died 1958, former Assistant Chief Valuer of the Land Tax Department, and former member of the Australian Land Board

Other
Jed Richards, author of 'One Long Day'

Other 
In 2008, Pulteney Grammar School was accused of discriminating against two brothers, students at the school, by offering financial incentives to female students but not males, whose fees exceed $21,000 p.a.

In 2009, many parents, heritage groups and members of the general public condemned Pulteney's plan to demolish the school's Morgan Building, a landmark South Terrace bluestone mansion, using funding from the Federal Government's stimulus package for new school buildings. While the building was not heritage listed, it is one of the last remaining mansions on South Terrace and was recommended in 1992 for conservation under Adelaide's Townscape List. The school went ahead with their plans of demolition, despite a letter written by the Adelaide City Council to the school arguing against the proposal. David Beaumont of the National Heritage Trust said that Pulteney Grammar was "A school which should be setting an example in fact demolishing history instead of teaching it" and in an interview, one parent stated "...It’s [Pulteney Grammar] a values based school but it’s only values that suit them at the school".

See also 
List of schools in South Australia

Further reading 

 W. R. Ray, Pulteney Grammar School 1847-1972 : a record (1973).
 W.R. Ray and  K. Brunton, F.H. Greet & J.R. Moore, Pulteney Grammar School 1847-1997 : a record. Revised and brought up to date (1997).
 Lingard Goulding, Under the kurrajong trees : Pulteney Grammar School from 1847 until 2020 (2020)

References

External links 
Pulteney Grammar School website

Anglican primary schools in Adelaide
Anglican secondary schools in Adelaide
Educational institutions established in 1847
Junior School Heads Association of Australia Member Schools
1847 establishments in Australia
South Terrace, Adelaide